Inga caudata is a species of plant in the family Fabaceae. It is found only in Brazil.

References

caudata
Flora of Brazil
Vulnerable plants
Taxonomy articles created by Polbot